Jana Gantnerová (born 15 July 1989 in Kežmarok) is a Slovak Alpine skier.

She made her debut in the Alpine Skiing World Cup on 22 October 2005, but she has yet to place in the top 30 in any World Cup event.

Gantnerová took part in the 2006 Winter Olympics and also represented Slovakia at the 2010 Winter Olympics.

She is the daughter of alpine skier Jana Gantnerová-Šoltýsová and Juraj Gantner, a former ski mountaineer who is also Jana's coach.

References

External links

Slovak female alpine skiers
Olympic alpine skiers of Slovakia
Alpine skiers at the 2006 Winter Olympics
Alpine skiers at the 2010 Winter Olympics
Alpine skiers at the 2014 Winter Olympics
Universiade medalists in alpine skiing
1989 births
Living people
People from Prešov District
Sportspeople from the Prešov Region
Universiade gold medalists for Slovakia
Universiade silver medalists for Slovakia
Universiade bronze medalists for Slovakia
Competitors at the 2011 Winter Universiade
Competitors at the 2013 Winter Universiade
Competitors at the 2015 Winter Universiade